Trechispora is a genus of fungi in the family Hydnodontaceae. Basidiocarps (fruit bodies) are variously corticioid (effused, patch-forming) or clavarioid (branched and coral-like) with spore-bearing surfaces that are variously smooth to hydnoid or poroid. The genus occurs worldwide, though individual species may be localized. Around 50 species have been described to date.

Taxonomy

Trechispora was introduced in 1890 by Finnish mycologist Petter Karsten to describe a fragile, effused fungus with a poroid hymenium and small, spiny basidiospores. His type and only species, T. onusta, is now known to be a synonym of the earlier name Polyporus hymenocystis (= Trechispora hymenocystis). Additional species with a similar micromorphology have subsequently been added to the genus.

The genus Scytinopogon was introduced by Rolf Singer in 1945 to accommodate tropical and subtropical fungi with clavarioid basidiocarps having flattened branches and producing small, spiny to warty basidiospores. Molecular research, based on cladistic analysis of DNA sequences, has however shown that Scytinopogon species are nested within Trechispora  (which they resemble microscopically) and are consequently not a separate genus but are simply Trechispora species with clavarioid basidiocarps.

Species

Trechispora alnicola
Trechispora amianthina
Trechispora antipus
Trechispora araneosa
Trechispora bispora
Trechispora brasiliensis
Trechispora brassicicola
Trechispora byssinella
Trechispora canariensis
Trechispora candidissima
Trechispora caucasica
Trechispora chartacea
Trechispora clancularis
Trechispora cohaerens
Trechispora copiosa
Trechispora dimitica
Trechispora donkii
Trechispora elongata
Trechispora farinacea
Trechispora fastidiosa
Trechispora gelatinosa
Trechispora gillesii
Trechispora gloeospora
Trechispora granulifera
Trechispora havencampii
Trechispora hymenocystis
Trechispora incisa
Trechispora invisitata
Trechispora kavinioides
Trechispora laevis
Trechispora microspora
Trechispora minima
Trechispora minispora
Trechispora minuta
Trechispora mollusca
Trechispora mutabilis
Trechispora nivea
Trechispora pallescens
Trechispora papillosa
Trechispora petrophila
Trechispora polygonospora
Trechispora praefocata
Trechispora regularis
Trechispora rigida
Trechispora sphaerocystis
Trechispora sphaerospora
Trechispora stellulata
Trechispora stevensonii
Trechispora subhelvetica
Trechispora subsphaerospora
Trechispora tenuicula
Trechispora termitophila
Trechispora trigonospora
Trechispora variseptata
Trechispora verruculosa

References

Trechisporales
Trechisporales genera